Ceremony is a 1969 album by progressive UK rock band Spooky Tooth in collaboration with French experimental composer Pierre Henry. The world premier was on September 2, 1970 at Olympia, Paris, France. The album was dedicated to Béatrice.

History and critical reception

The album takes the form of a church service.

Despite the project being instigated by Gary Wright, the album is considered by him to have ended the band's career.  The album is described by another as being "one of the great screw-ups in rock history".  As Wright describes it, "...we did a project that wasn't our album. It was with this French electronic music composer named Pierre Henry. We just told the label, 'You know this is his album, not our album. We'll play on it just like musicians.' And then when the album was finished, they said, 'Oh no no — it's great. We're gonna release this as your next album.' We said, 'You can't do that. It doesn't have anything to do with the direction of Spooky Two and it will ruin our career.' And that's exactly what happened."  Wright left the band following the release of the album.

Track listing

Personnel
 Pierre Henry – musique concrete, electronics

Spooky Tooth
 Mike Harrison – vocals, keyboards
 Luther Grosvenor – guitars
 Gary Wright – vocals, electronic organ, keyboards
 Andy Leigh – bass
 Mike Kellie – drums, percussion

Production
 Produced by Pierre Henry and Spooky Tooth
 Recorded and engineered by Andy Johns
John Holmes – cover painting

Notes

References

External links
 
 mutant-sounds.blogspot.com

1969 albums
Spooky Tooth albums
Island Records albums
Collaborative albums
Pierre Henry albums
Albums produced by Pierre Henry
Albums produced by Gary Wright
Albums produced by Luther Grosvenor
Albums produced by Mike Harrison (musician)
Albums produced by Mike Kellie